Comin Asia is an engineering company and general contractor based in Cambodia, Vietnam, Thailand, Laos, and Myanmar. Comin participates in major construction and improvement projects in Southeast Asia and the Mekong River area, including hotels, factories, infrastructure projects, power plants, network security and automation, and office buildings.

Company
The company is composed of six major subsidiaries:
Comin Khmere, Cambodia based in Phnom Penh
Comin Asia, Vietnam based in Hanoi and Ho Chi Minh City
Comin Asia, Laos based in Vientiane
Comin Asia, Myanmar based in Yangon
Comin Asia, Singapore.

History
Comin Khmere was first established in 1960 as a branch of the East Asiatic Company and by 1966 had 15 subsidiary companies employing over 3,000 people.  The company was dissolved during the war in Cambodia in the 1970s and reformed in 1992.

In 1992, Comin Khmere and Comin Vietnam began operations working on building projects and infrastructure projects in the Mekong River area.

In 2010 Comin Asia started collaborating with RMA Group in the field of engineering.

Operations
Comin Asia specializes in mechanical engineering and electrical engineering work, typically providing electrical systems, electrical grid connections, elevator automation systems, air conditioning and heating systems, and communications systems for its clients.  The company specializes in work for the hospitality industry, including hotels and resorts.

Major contracts and commissions include:

Cambodia:
 American Embassy
 Crown Can Factory - PP & SHV
 Vattanac Capital Tower
 ACLEDA Bank Plc Headquarters
 AEON Mall Phnom Penh
 International School Of Phnom Penh
 National Bank of Cambodia
Siem Reap International Airport and Phnom Penh International Airport projects
The construction of the 23 MW Kampot Power Plant in association with Wärtsilä Finland
The construction of a 30 MW power plant for electrical utility company Khmer Electrical Power in association with Wärtsilä Finland

Vietnam:
 Golden Westlake Residential Development
 Sheraton Nha Trang
 BIDV Tower
 RMIT Academic Building 2
 Le Meridien Saigon
Camau Power Plant
Hanoi Petroleum Trading Center, an office building owned by PetroVietnam

Thai:
 Karma Samui
 Conrad Resort & Spa Koh Samui
 KC Hotel
 CD&P Unique
 The Lotus Terrace
 KC Beach

Laos:
 Lao CoCa Cola Bottling
 Mascot

Myanmar:
 Honey Garments Factory
 Coca-Cola Pinya Beverages Myanmar

References

 Comin Asia

Construction and civil engineering companies of Cambodia
Companies of Laos
Conglomerate companies of Myanmar
Construction and civil engineering companies established in 1960
1960 establishments in Cambodia